Pancreatic endopeptidase E (cholesterol-binding proteinase, proteinase E, cholesterol-binding serine proteinase, pancreatic protease E, pancreatic proteinase E, cholesterol-binding pancreatic proteinase, CBPP, pancreas E proteinase) is an enzyme. This enzyme catalyses the following chemical reaction

 Preferential cleavage: Ala-. Does not hydrolyse elastin

This enzyme is peptidase of family S1 (trypsin family) from pancreatic juice.

References

External links 
 

EC 3.4.21